Yelena Oleynikova (born 9 December 1976 in Zernograd) is a retired Russian athlete who specialised in the triple jump. She won the bronze at the 2002 European Championships.

She has personal bests of 14.83 metres outdoors and 14.60 metres indoors, both from 2002.

International competitions

See also
List of European Athletics Championships medalists (women)
List of European Athletics Indoor Championships medalists (women)

References

1976 births
Living people
People from Zernogradsky District
Sportspeople from Rostov Oblast
Russian female triple jumpers
Universiade medalists in athletics (track and field)
Universiade bronze medalists for Russia
Medalists at the 2001 Summer Universiade
Competitors at the 2001 Goodwill Games
World Athletics Championships athletes for Russia
European Athletics Championships medalists
Russian Athletics Championships winners